The depopulation of Havaru Thinadhoo was an event that took place in 1962, following the formation of the United Suvadive Republic, when Thinadhoo, the wealthiest island at the time was forcefully depopulated and destroyed.

Havaru Thinadhoo operated 9 long haul ships, Gadhdhoo 2 ships, Nilandhoo 3 ships and Dhaandhoo 2 ships with a total of 16 ships in Huvadhu. Thinadhoo was famous throughout the Indian Ocean for their frequent trips. The accumulation of wealth outside the monopoly of the Sultan enabled the southern atolls of Maldives to form an embryo of thalassocracy.

First rebellion 
In July 1959, Ibrahim Nasir travelled in a gunboat with army personnel to Thinadhoo and attacked the residents, arresting the alleged leaders of the United Suvadive Republic present at the time.

Great Britain expressed their disapproval of the Maldivian government because of the violent attack against inhabitants of Huvadu on 7 August 1959.

Partitioning of Huvadu Atoll 
Huvadu Atoll was partitioned to two administrative regions after the first rebellion. It was called Huvadu East and West and later renamed to Huvadu South and North. The partitions are currently known as Gaafu Alif Atoll and Gaaf Dhaal Atoll.

Second rebellion 
All photos and videos posted on Thinadhoo in connection with the incident of Maldives Prime Minister Ibrahim Nasir are connected to the first uprising. No public media on the second uprising has been released as of yet. It is claimed that Prime Minister Ibrahim Nasir had access to video and images that had been shot.

The second uprising began as a result of the several laws enacted in the Maldives that impacted the merchants of Havaru Thinadhoo. This included increased tariffs and a new payment mechanism for sold items that passed via the Maldives government, resulting in extended delays in payments to merchants in Havaru Thinadhoo. The new structure hampered Havaru Thinadhoo's thriving economy.

Another cause of the second insurrection was abusive behavior by Maldives government soldiers stationed in Havaru Thinadhoo.

Additional appeals to ameliorate Havaru Thinadhoo's condition were addressed to the Maldives government, but no response was returned. According to Karankaa Rasheed, a staff member of the Maldives' people's majlis (parliament), such a letter was never received and the mission to put an end to the insurrection was maintained a state secret.

Electing the leader of United Suvadive for Thinadhoo 
Olha Didi ge Hassan Didi and Muhammadh Hameed were two among the individuals striving to make things better for Thinadhoo. When they learned of their impending detention by the Maldivian authorities, they were in Addu.

Discussions with the Thinadhoo residents of Addu were undertaken, and 190 persons participated in the voting process. Its purpose was to re-establish the United Suvadive Republic and elect the leader of Huvadhoo to do so. Olha Didi ge Hassan Didi won the election to head Huvadu atoll as the United Suvadive Republic with 140 votes.  Olha Didi ge Hassan Didi was 19 years old at the time.

Another meeting was organized in Addu with Thinadhoo people, and according to it, on the night of 5 June 1961, supporters of United Suvadive entered Thinadhoo from the side of Baraasil, arrested Maldives troops and those who represented them, and transported them captive to Addu.

In a second meeting, Afeef Didi, the president of the United Suvadive Republic on Addu, urged the restoration of the United Suvadives in Huvadhoo Atoll.

Turmoil in the south 
The second uprising occurred with the re-establishment of the United Suvadive Republic in Thinadhoo. It approved a new legislation that authorized the imprisonment, confiscation of all money, and destruction of the houses of anybody who publicly opposed the United Suvadive. The population of Huvadhoo atoll, especially Thinadhoo, were split in their support for the United Suvadive Republic but were hesitant to express their dissent owing to the law. There was internal strife in Thinadhoo before Silvercrest came. According to inhabitants of Gaddhoo, supporters of United Suvadive ransacked the island, ruined its properties, and beat its residents because of their disagreement.

Arrival of Silvercrest 
On January 30, 1962, between 2:30 and 3 PM, the boat known as "Silvercrest," under the command of Prime Minister Ibrahim Nasir, landed at Havaru Thinadhoo. It transported soldiers equipped with five rifles and ten submachine guns.

Thinadhoo had built a bullet-proof wall termed "Fasbadi" that was 400 feet long, 4 feet high, and 3 feet broad in preparation for Silvercrest's arrival. It was made of sand and stretched around the front jetty. When Olha Didi ge Hassan Didi saw Silvercrest approaching the island, he advised people to get behind the Fasbadi since Silvercrest would shoot towards the island once it got close. Muhammadh Hameed, the other senior United Suvadive representative for Thinadhoo, was not on the island at the time.

Capturing of dhoani for assault 
Before approaching Thinadhoo, Silvercrest pursued a dhoani (vessel) carrying men and women returning to Thinadhoo after working on the adjacent island of Kaadeddhoo. Capturing a Dhoani was most likely done to utilize it as a vessel to infiltrate Thinadhoo. After failing to capture the dhoani, it moved on to capture four more dhoanis returning to Thinadhoo. After failing to catch any of them, Silvercrest fired warning bullets at them, which went unheeded. After hearing the gunshots, one of the dhoanis' crews went into shock and died in Thinadhoo. When Prime Minister Ibrahim Nasir ordered his men to the island, several locals went into shock, vomited, and subsequently died after hearing gunshots and watching boats and buildings burn.

After failing to capture the four dhoanis, Silvercrest approached and captured a dhoani approaching from the south of Kaadeddhoo. They then navigated the dhoani along with Silvercrest to Thinadhoo.

Shooting at Havaru Thinadhoo 
After approaching the island, Silvercrest utilized loudspeakers to advise the population of Thinadhoo to surrender and to raise the Maldives flag instead of the United Suvadive Republic flag. Prime Minister Ibrahim Nasir declared that everyone would be pardoned if those requirements were satisfied. Following the announcement, they opened fire on Thinadhoo. Residents watched as the leaves and branches of breadfruit trees near the Vaaruge (Tax House) splintered and birds fled away in response to the noise.

The shooting killed one person and wounded numerous others. Many had died as a result of the shock of seeing the violence and the subsequent depopulation.

Sending of captive to demand surrender 
Zakariya Moosa, one of the hostages from the previous caught Dhoani by Silvercrest, was transported to Thinadhoo to provide another warning. He was supposed to swim to the island while holding on to a wooden plank that had been shot in multiple places. While he swam to Thinadhoo, Prime Minister Ibrahim Nasir used binoculars to view the events from Silvercrest.

Following his arrival on the island, Prime Minister Ibrahim Nasir directed him to request Thinadhoo's surrender and to hoist the Maldive flag. Residents on behalf of Thinadhoo, as well as any United Suvadive senior, were offered the option to surrender by coming to Silvercrest. If this were done, no one would be hurt and everyone would be forgiven. Zakariya Moosa then displayed the gunshot-damaged wooden board to the resident. While Zakariya Moosa was still delivering the warning, he was seized and imprisoned in the Thinadhoo food store by supporters of United Suvadive.

Silvercrest anchoring for the night 
Silvercrest used a loudspeaker to provide the warning, and until dusk that day, it fired towards Thinadhoo. After sunset, supporters of United Suvadive moved their forces inside Thinadhoo to prevent anybody from announcing their surrender.  Silvercrest then sailed to the adjacent island of Maakiri Gala before dusk, where it moored for the night.

Messengers with word of surrender 
After daybreak that day in Thinadhoo, Huvaru Thinadhoo Moosa Fathuhi met with Abdul Wahhab of Bansaarige, the atoll office secretary, and Mohamed Hussain of Maabadeyrige, a policeman. At the time, Moosa Fathuhi was under house arrest. Moosa Fathuhy and Wahhab met to talk about the surrender. Mohamed Hussain had a talk about surrender with the remaining elders in Thinadhoo as well, but he was unable to persuade anybody to travel to Silvercrest because they were worried the new legislation would harm them and lose their belongings if they were apprehended by United Suvadive supporters. Later that evening, Abdul Wahhab and Mohamed Hussain slipped away from the United Suvadive Thinadhoo supporters aboard a Bokkura (small boat) bound towards Silvercrest to declare surrender on behalf of the island's residents, as commanded by Prime Minister Ibrahim Nasir.

The boat was illuminated by soldiers getting ready to fire as Abdul Wahhab and Mohamed Hussain approached Silvercrest. It boarded the two when it noticed them and brought them to Silvercrest, where Prime Minister Ibrahim Nasir interrogated them. They were not informed if the Thinadhoo people, who came on their behalf and surrendered, had been granted a pardon.

Following news of Abdul Wahhab and Mohamed Hussain's meeting on Silvercrest, supporters of the United Suvadive in Thinadhoo showed hostility against their dwellings. Wahhab and Hussain both offered to attend because none of them held any properties in Thinadhoo in their own names.

Sunrise and preparation for attack 
All of the Dhoani's remaining prisoners, who had been caught earlier by Silvercrest, were transported to Thinadhoo in the Bokkura carried by Wahhab and Hussain. Following that, troops and Ibrahim Nasir's aides boarded the Dhoani, which was under their control. Ibrahim Nasir also ordered Wahhab and Hussain to board the Dhoani with the military and his subordinates.

Torching of Arumaadhu Odis (large ships) 
The Dhoani, together with the troops and others, then set sail towards Havaru Thinadhoo. As it drew near, it set fire to the Odi (big ship) "Fathuhul Mubarak," which was anchored outside of it and owned by Havaru Thinadhoo Naib Ismail Didi. Residents in Thinadhoo who were near the jetty area watched the burning of the Odi.

Following this, all of the large ships (Arumaadhu Odi) moored on the outskirts of Thinadhoo were destroyed by fire.

The ships were:

 Arumaadhu Odi "Barakathul Rahman" owned by Mudim Hussain Thakurufaan
 Arumaadhu Odi "Fathuhul Majeed" owned by Muhammad Kaleyfaan
 Naalu Bethelli (large boat) named "Ganima" owned by Abubakuru Katheeb Kaleyfaan
 Naalu Baththeli (large boat) owned by Addu Hithadhoo Finifenmaage Abdullah Afeef

Attacking from ashore 
As the Dhoani and the troops went closer to Thinadhoo, Abdul Wahhab and Mohamed Hussain were ordered to dive into the shallow waters and use a rope to pull the Dhoani towards the island. The troops then utilized the megaphone to demand surrender and raise the Maldive flag rather than the Suvadive flag. Everyone was to be forgiven if this was accomplished. Following the announcement, submachine guns were fired into the air. All directives were followed out according to Prime Minister Ibrahim Nasir. 

People from the outer wall in Havaru Thinadhoo were throwing stones at the Dhoani as they approached the area with Fasbadi. The troops continued to fire while yelling for the Maldives flag to be raised.

The flag of the United Suvadive Republic was hoisted at the end of a 40-foot-long flag pole at Havaru Thinadhoo's jetty area. After Prime Minister Ibrahim Nasir requested surrender, it was further restrained with a rope to make it difficult for anyone to untie it.

Attempt to untie the Suvadive flag 
When Abdul Wahhab landed, he made multiple attempts to climb the flagpole and untie it. Every time, United Suvadive supporters threw rocks at him to stop him from finishing the task. Thinadhoo was still being fired upon by the troops in the Dhoani.

When the Dhoani and their men reached the opposite side of the Fasbadi wall, the people throwing rocks at them lost their safety. They fled to the neighborhood school known as "Madursathul Ameer Ibrahim" without the wall's protection. The majority remained outdoors while some went inside. The United Suvadive Republic of Thinadhoo's leadership members ordered the imprisonment of some of the town's citizens who went against them within the school.

Another messenger with word of surrender 
At this juncture, a respected islander named Havaru Thinadhoo Moosa Fathuhy approached the Dhoani by wading into the shallow water and proclaiming the islanders' surrender. He came nearer to the Dhoani when Annabeel Muhammadh Imaddhudheen, who was inside the Dhoani with the army, issued the order to approach.

Assault in Thinadhoo. Burning of haruges (boat shelters) 
The same soldier who previously set ships on fire stepped ashore at Thinadhoo and set Olha Didi Katheeb, the Thinadhoo Katheebs Haruge (boat shelter) on fire. The Haruge was completely consumed by fire, which also destroyed Katti Ibrahimbe's and Moosa Fathuhy's haruges.

Surrendering by hoisting the Maldives flag goes unheeded 
The Dhoani moved towards the main jetty after burning the Haruges' while firing at the island. They stopped firing when they observed the United Suvadive Republic flag being lowered and the Maldives flag being raised. Havaru Thinadhoo Diamond Villa Ali Rasheed carried out this action. Even earlier, according to Ali Rasheed, he made multiple attempts to lower the flag. Bullets were being shot between the "Madrasathul Ameer Ibrahim" building and the site of the flag pole, making it impossible for him to try to cross the route. When the Dhoani with the troops left the area, he finally had the chance to climb the pole.

Continued assault and arrival of Ibrahim Nasir to Thinadhoo 
After a brief pause to take down the United Suvadive flag, the gunfire resumed. Ibrahim Nasir, the prime minister, arrived in Thinadhoo shortly after.

Depopulation and destruction 
Prime Minister Ibrahim Nasir gave the order to evacuate Havaru Thinadhoo by dusk when he arrived. Soldiers were sent over the island to carry out the command. All of the island's inhabitants, including women, children, and the elderly, were made to remain in shallow water up to their necks throughout the depopulation. The island was then pillaged, robbed, and depleted of its riches. Survivors claim that a large number of individuals perished as a result of the incident's aftermath. There are around 6,000 people living on Thinadhoo, and the burning of boats rendered it difficult for them to evacuate the island.

Following the island's depopulation, the island's properties were fully burned and destroyed. Following depopulation, the Maldives government's official publication "Viyafaari Miyadhu" stated that "the island of Havaru Thinadhoo now had neither residents nor houses."

Many Havaru Thinadhoo residents were imprisoned, tortured, and subjected to systematic abuse and rape. 

The leaders of the United Suvadive Republic in Thinadhoo, as well as many others, perished in prison under questionable circumstances.

Aftermath 
Thinadhoo had an estimated population of 6,000 persons prior to depopulation in 1959. It was estimated that there were barely 1,800 individuals left after relocation began on August 22, 1966.

Speaking during an event celebrating the 55th anniversary of Thinadhoo's re-population, the Mayor of Addu noted that expelling the island's inhabitants was one of the cruelest episodes in Maldivian history.

Transitional Justice 
The Ombudsperson's Office for Transitional Justice is investigating the situation.  Chief Ombudsperson Abdul Salaam Arif told that if the case is just focused on the depopulation of Thinadhoo, it will be hard to find the truth. In this respect, he stated that various venues for the hearing were investigated, after which the office decided to broaden the scope of the public's testimonies.

Thinadhoo council demands 
Thinadhoo Council has requested that the building of former Prime Minister Ibrahim Nasir, which has been confiscated by the state, be called 'GDh. Thinadhoo Velaanaage' as restitution.

They have also requested that the state issue a formal apology to the Thinadhoo people, uphold the rights that have been violated, and seize 50% of the income from the assets of all culprits to be delivered to the Thinadhoo people as restitution for life.

References 

United Suvadive Republic
Crimes against humanity
Crimes against children
Genocidal massacres